Chahdegal Rural District is a rural district (dehestan) in Negin Kavir District, Fahraj County, Kerman Province, Iran. At the 2006 census, its population was 17,849, in 4,159 families. The rural district has 74 villages.

References 

Rural Districts of Kerman Province
Fahraj County